Lobogenesis trematerrae is a species of moth of the family Tortricidae. It is found in the Western Cordillera of Colombia.

The wingspan is 16 mm. The ground colour of the forewings is brownish, sprinkled and strigulated (finely streaked) with dark brown and with dark brown markings. The hindwings are brownish cream, strigulated with brownish.

Etymology
The species is named in honour of Prof. Dr Pascuale Trematerra.

References

Moths described in 2011
Euliini
Moths of South America
Taxa named by Józef Razowski